Partition chromatography theory and practice was introduced through the work and publications of Archer Martin and Richard Laurence Millington Synge during the 1940s. They would later receive the 1952 Nobel Prize in Chemistry "for their invention of partition chromatography".

Synopsis
The process of separating mixtures of chemical compounds by passing them through a column that contains a solid stationary phase that was eluted with a mobile phase (column chromatography) was well known at that time. Chromatographic separation was considered to occur by an adsorption process whereby compounds adhered to a solid media and were washed off the column with a solvent, mixture of solvents, or solvent gradient. In contrast, Martin and Synge developed and described a chromatographic separation process whereby compounds were partitioned between two liquid phases similar to the separatory funnel liquid-liquid separation dynamic. This was an important departure, both in theory and in practice, from adsorption chromatography.

In liquid-liquid separation, a compound is distributed between two immiscible liquid phases under equilibrium conditions.  Martin and Synge initially attempted to devise a method of performing a sequential liquid-liquid extraction with serially connected glass vessels that functioned as separatory funnels. The seminal article presenting their early studies described a rather complicated instrument that allowed partitioning of amino acids between water and chloroform phases. The process was termed "counter-current liquid-liquid extraction." Martin and Synge described the theory of this technique in reference to continuous fractional distillation described by Randall and Longtin. This approach was deemed too cumbersome, so they developed a method of absorbing water onto silica gel as the stationary phase and using a solvent, such as chloroform, as the mobile phase. This work was published in 1941 as "a new form of chromatogram employing two liquid phases." The article describes both the theory in terms of the partition coefficient of a compound, and the application of the process to the separation of amino acids on a water-impregnated silica column eluted with a water:chloroform:n-butanol solvent mixture.

The impact on separation methodology
The previously described work of Martin and Synge impacted the development of the previously known column chromatography and inspired new forms of chromatography such as countercurrent distribution, paper chromatography, and gas-liquid chromatography which is more commonly known as gas chromatography. The modification of silica gel stationary phase led to many creative ways of modifying stationary phases in order to influence the separation characteristics. The most notable modification was the chemical bonding of alkane functional groups to silica gel to produce reversed-phase media. The original problem that Martin and Synge encountered with devising an instrument that would employ two free-flowing liquid phases was solved by Lyman C. Craig in 1944, and commercial counter-current distribution instruments were used for many important discoveries. The introduction of paper chromatography was an important analytical technique which gave rise to thin-layer chromatography. Finally, gas-liquid chromatography, a fundamental technique in modern analytical chemistry, was described by Martin with coauthors A. T. James and G. Howard Smith in 1952.

References

Chromatography